Chak 234 GB PanjPulla  also called Chak 234 GB PATIALA is located in between of  Chak 235 GB Partab Garh and Chak 233 GB Kot Barseer in Tehsil Jaranwala district Faisalabad, Pakistan. There is one primary school for girls and a middle school for boys in the village. there is also rail station Panj Pulla meaning five bridges on Shorkot–Sheikhupura Branch Line

This village is far from main Jaranwala-Nankana Road. There is daily bus service from Jaranwala to 234 GB via Chak 236 GB Kilanwala.

See also
Government Islamia High School Jaranwala

References

Villages in Faisalabad District